Knox Community High School is the only high school in Knox, Indiana. Knox is located centrally in Starke County, in the northwest/north central part of the state.

General information
Knox High School is a public school that houses approximately 830 students in grades 9-12. , the school's principal is Mr. Glenn Barnes.

There are 45 full-time faculty members, two administrators, one full-time athletic director, and two guidance counselors. Knox High School has over 100 course offerings. Students are also encouraged to aspire to a Core 40 or Academic Honors Diploma. There are 19 varsity athletic programs and a large arts department, which includes marching band, concert band, jazz band, indoor percussion, a fall play, and a spring musical, along with academic teams such as Spell Bowl, Academic Super Bowl, and the Speech Team.

The mascot is an Indian. The school colors are red, white, and blue.

Knox Community High School has received multiple Bronze Medal ratings in the U.S. News/School Matters Best High Schools survey.

Music
Knox was first named as one of the NAMM Foundation's "Best Communities for Music Education" in 2016, an honor that it has maintained annually.

See also
 List of high schools in Indiana
 Native American mascot controversy
 Sports teams named Redskins

References

External links
 School website
 District website
 School snapshot

Educational institutions in the United States with year of establishment missing
Public high schools in Indiana
Schools in Starke County, Indiana
1894 establishments in Indiana